Night Accident is a 2017 Kyrgyzstani drama film directed by Temirbek Birnazarov. It was selected as the Kyrgyz entry for the Best Foreign Language Film at the 91st Academy Awards. However, it was not on the final list of submitted films released by Academy of Motion Picture Arts and Sciences in October 2018.

Cast
 Akylbek Abdykalykov as Old Man
 Bayish Ismanov as Skinny
 Dina Jakob as Girl
 Elmirbek Kubatbekov as Son
 Akylbek Murataliyev as Official

See also
 List of submissions to the 91st Academy Awards for Best Foreign Language Film
 List of Kyrgyz submissions for the Academy Award for Best Foreign Language Film

References

External links
 

2017 films
2017 drama films
Kyrgyzstani drama films
Kyrgyz-language films